Idotea granulosa is a species of marine isopod in the family Idoteidae.

References 
 http://zipcodezoo.com/Animals/I/Idotea_granulosa/

Valvifera
Crustaceans described in 1843